Robert Briedis (born 1 January 1957) is a former Australian rules footballer who played with North Melbourne in the Victorian Football League (VFL).. He is the brother of North Melbourne teammate Arnold Briedis.

Notes

External links 

Living people
1957 births
Australian rules footballers from Victoria (Australia)
Australian people of Latvian descent
North Melbourne Football Club players